The Men's high jump at the 2010 Commonwealth Games as part of the athletics programme was held at the Jawaharlal Nehru Stadium on Thursday 7 and Saturday 9 October 2010.

Records

Results

Qualifying round
Qualification: Qualifying Performance 2.16 (Q) or at least 12 best performers (q) advance to the Final.

Final

External links
2010 Commonwealth Games - Athletics

Men's high jump
2010